"Green Goblin Reborn!" is a 1971 Marvel Comics story arc which features Spider-Man fighting against his arch enemy Norman Osborn, the Green Goblin. This arc was published in The Amazing Spider-Man #96–98 (May–July 1971) and was plotted and written by Stan Lee, with art by penciler Gil Kane and inker John Romita Sr. It is recognized as the first mainstream comic publication which portrayed and condemned drug abuse since the formation of the Comics Code Authority, and in time led to the revision of the Code's rigidity.

Plot outline
Issue #96 begins with Peter Parker, who is low on funds, moving in with Harry Osborn and accepting a job with Harry's father, Norman. Parker knows Norman Osborn is secretly Spider-Man's arch enemy, the Green Goblin; however, Osborn currently has amnesia and doesn't remember Parker's double identity as Spider-Man. Soon, Spider-Man sees a man dancing on a rooftop and claiming he can fly. When the man falls, Spider-Man saves him. Realizing the man is high on drugs, he says "I would rather face a hundred super-villains than throw my life away on hard drugs, because it is a battle you cannot win!" At the end of issue #96, Norman Osborn regains his memory and turns into the Green Goblin again.

In issue #97, the Green Goblin attacks Spider-Man, then disappears mysteriously. At home, Parker is shocked to find that Harry is popping pills because Harry's love interest Mary Jane Watson was affectionate toward Parker. Later, while Spider-Man is hunting the Green Goblin, Harry buys more drugs and suffers a drug overdose. Parker finds him in time to rush him to the hospital. In issue #98, Spider-Man lures the Green Goblin to Harry's hospital room. When he sees his sick son, Norman Osborn faints, and the Green Goblin is vanquished. At the end of issue #98, Peter and his estranged girlfriend Gwen Stacy rekindle their relationship.

Historical significance
This was the first story arc in mainstream comics that portrayed and condemned the abuse of drugs. This effectively led to the revision of the Comics Code. Previously, the Code forbade the depiction of the use of illegal drugs, even negatively. However, in 1970 the Nixon administration's Department of Health, Education, and Welfare asked Stan Lee to publish an anti-drug message in one of Marvel's top-selling titles. Lee chose the top-selling The Amazing Spider-Man; issues #96–98 (May–July 1971) feature a story arc depicting the negative effects of drug use. Acknowledging that young readers (the primary audience for Amazing Spider-Man) do not like being lectured to, Lee wrote the story to focus on the entertainment value, with the anti-drug message inserted as subtly as possible.

While the story had a clear anti-drug message, the Comics Code Authority refused to issue its seal of approval. Marvel nevertheless published the three issues without the Comics Code Authority's approval or seal. The issues sold so well that the industry's self-censorship was undercut and the Code was subsequently revised. Weeks later, DC Comics published a two-issue story in the series Green Lantern in which Green Arrow's teen-aged ward, Speedy, starts using heroin when his mentor leaves him to travel across America with Green Lantern.

Lee recalled in a 1998 interview:

Marvel Comics editor-in-chief Joe Quesada called it the one Spider-Man comic that made him a lifelong fan, saying his father "encouraged [me] to read these issues and... I really got hooked... What my father didn't realize was that he was starting a whole other addiction [to comic books]".

See also
 "Snowbirds Don't Fly" — the first DC Comics anti-drug arc, featuring Green Arrow sidekick Speedy as a junkie. It also was published in 1971, weeks after the "Green Goblin Reborn" arc.

References

Further reading

Comics about drugs
Comics by Stan Lee
Green Goblin